The following highways are numbered 129:

Canada
 Ontario Highway 129
 Prince Edward Island Route 129

Costa Rica
 National Route 129

India
 National Highway 129 (India)

Japan
 Japan National Route 129

United States
 Interstate 129
 U.S. Route 129
 Alabama State Route 129
 Arkansas Highway 129
 California State Route 129
 Florida State Road 129
 County Road 129 (Columbia County, Florida)
 Georgia State Route 129
 Illinois Route 129
 Indiana State Road 129
 K-129 (disambiguation) (former), two former highways
 Kentucky Route 129
 Louisiana Highway 129
 Maine State Route 129
 Maryland Route 129
 Massachusetts Route 129
 Massachusetts Route 129A
 M-129 (Michigan highway)
 Missouri Route 129
 New Hampshire Route 129
 New Jersey Route 129
 New Mexico State Road 129
 New York State Route 129
 County Route 129 (Jefferson County, New York)
 County Route 129 (Monroe County, New York)
 County Route 129 (Niagara County, New York)
 County Route 129 (Seneca County, New York)
 County Route 129 (Westchester County, New York)
 Ohio State Route 129
 Pennsylvania Route 129 (former)
 South Carolina Highway 129
 Tennessee State Route 129
 Texas State Highway 129 (former)
 Texas State Highway Spur 129
 Farm to Market Road 129
 Utah State Route 129 (disambiguation), several former highways and a current one
 Vermont Route 129
 Virginia State Route 129
 Virginia State Route 129 (1928-1933) (former)
 Washington State Route 129
 West Virginia Route 129
 Wisconsin Highway 129

Territories
 Puerto Rico Highway 129